Buckland Dinham is a small village near Frome in Somerset, England. The village has a population of 381.  The village's main industry is farming (arable and dairy), but the village is also a dormitory village for the nearby cities of Bath and Bristol.

History
In 951 King Eadred granted land at Buckland to his relative Ælfhere.

The village used to be known as Buckland Denham. Denham is believed to be a family name (there are many other villages with Denham in their name) whilst Buckland may refer to a former deer population. Although Buckland Dinham itself does not have a manor house, it is close to Orchardleigh Estate.

There are signs of prehistoric archaeology. A hand axe has been found in Lower Street (which follows the spring line). Kingsdown Camp is an Iron Age hill fort. It is a Scheduled Ancient Monument. There is an entrance on the northeast side. The fort continued to be used by the Romans.

The parish of Buckland Denham was part of the Kilmersdon Hundred.

The Dorset and Somerset Canal's branch to the Somerset coalfields would have passed via the bottom end of the Buckland vale, had it ever been completed. It is now just off the route of NCR 24, the Colliers Way.  The Murtry Aqueduct remains. Fussell's balance locks were built on the side of Barrow Hill, an extension of the hill on which Buckland Dinham is perched.

Governance

The parish council has responsibility for local issues, including setting an annual precept (local rate) to cover the council's operating costs and producing annual accounts for public scrutiny. The parish council evaluates local planning applications and works with the local police, district council officers, and neighbourhood watch groups on matters of crime, security, and traffic. The parish council's role also includes initiating projects for the maintenance and repair of parish facilities, as well as consulting with the district council on the maintenance, repair, and improvement of highways, drainage, footpaths, public transport, and street cleaning. Conservation matters (including trees and listed buildings) and environmental issues are also the responsibility of the council.

The village falls within the Non-metropolitan district of Mendip, which was formed on 1 April 1974 under the Local Government Act 1972, having previously been part of Frome Rural District, which is responsible for local planning and building control, local roads, council housing, environmental health, markets and fairs, refuse collection and recycling, cemeteries and crematoria, leisure services, parks, and tourism.

Somerset County Council is responsible for running the largest and most expensive local services such as education, social services, libraries, main roads, public transport, policing and  fire services, trading standards, waste disposal and strategic planning.

It is also part of the Somerton and Frome county constituency represented in the House of Commons of the Parliament of the United Kingdom. It elects one Member of Parliament (MP) by the first past the post system of election, and was part of the South West England constituency of the European Parliament prior to Britain leaving the European Union in January 2020, which elected seven MEPs using the d'Hondt method of party-list proportional representation.

Geography

Geographically, the village is on the side of a hill (known as Buckland Down). It looks out over a vale formed by several small streams, in particular the Buckland Brook, which leads southwards towards Frome (and other villages such as Great Elm and Mells). The Buckland Brook skirts the north-eastern side of the village.

Transport

It is on the A362 road from Radstock to Frome. Coming off this at the bottom of the hill is Lower Street, which subsequently turns uphill (as Sands Cross Hill) before looping back to the main road at the top of the village, opposite the Bell public house. Lanes also lead off to Lullington and Great Elm.

Buckland Dinham has never had a railway station, although the Great Western Railway branch from Frome to Radstock (and thence to Bristol) passes by the bottom of the valley. This is today unused by passenger trains, but limestone trains to Whatley Quarry use the line. They then seem to disappear into a clump of trees; in reality, a tunnel entrance is hidden, leading to Vallis Vale and the quarry.

Religious sites

The Church of St. Michael has a nave, chancel, south chapel and south porch which dates from around 1200. The north chapel was added in 1325, and a further chapel to the north of the chancel and the west tower being added in 1480. It underwent restoration in the late 19th century. It has been designated as a Grade I listed building.

References

External links

 Census data
 Dorset and Somerset Canal

Villages in Mendip District
Civil parishes in Somerset